Gymnopilus weberi is a species of mushroom in the family Hymenogastraceae. Found in North America, it was described as new to science in 1946 by mycologist William Alphonso Murrill.

See also

List of Gymnopilus species

References

Fungi described in 1946
Fungi of North America
weberi
Taxa named by William Alphonso Murrill